Jurica Jeleć (born 14 November 1986) is a Croatian footballer who plays as a striker, who last played for German lower league side Hajduk Nürnberg.

References

External links
Player profile at PrvaLiga 

1986 births
Living people
People from Sisak
Association football forwards
Croatian footballers
NK Lokomotiva Zagreb players
NK Vrapče players
NK Travnik players
NK Lučko players
NK Aluminij players
NK Zelina players
NK Bistra players
NK Hrvatski Dragovoljac players
NK Brežice 1919 players
Croatian Football League players
Premier League of Bosnia and Herzegovina players
Slovenian PrvaLiga players
First Football League (Croatia) players
Slovenian Second League players
Croatian expatriate footballers
Expatriate footballers in Slovenia
Croatian expatriate sportspeople in Slovenia
Expatriate footballers in Bosnia and Herzegovina
Croatian expatriate sportspeople in Bosnia and Herzegovina